Dolenčice is a small dispersed settlement north of Poljane in the Municipality of Gorenja Vas–Poljane in the Upper Carniola region of Slovenia.

Notable people
Notable people that were born or lived in Dolenčice include:
Anton Ažbe (1862–1905), painter

References

External links 

Dolenčice on Geopedia

Populated places in the Municipality of Gorenja vas-Poljane